Vishinul Harris (born 28 July 1993) is a Jamaican international footballer who plays for Arnett Gardens, as a midfielder.

Career

Arnett Gardens

Harris is a midfield stalwart for Arnett Gardens F.C.

International

He made his national team debut in 2017.

Honors

2016/2017 RSPL

References

1993 births
Living people
Jamaican footballers
Jamaica international footballers
Arnett Gardens F.C. players
Association football midfielders
National Premier League players